Tage Valfrid Flisberg (12 October 1917 – 13 May 1989) was a male Swedish international table tennis player.

He won a bronze medal at the 1949 World Table Tennis Championships in the men's doubles with Richard Bergmann. Five years later he won a silver medal at the 1954 World Table Tennis Championships in the men's singles.

See also
 List of table tennis players
 List of World Table Tennis Championships medalists

References

1917 births
1989 deaths
Swedish male table tennis players
World Table Tennis Championships medalists